"Careless Memories" is the second single by Duran Duran, released on 20 April 1981.

The band's debut single "Planet Earth" had been a Top 20 hit, so it was regarded as a major setback when "Careless Memories" stalled at No. 37 in the UK charts, particularly as it was to herald the June release of the debut album Duran Duran.

It has since come to light that the decision to release the single was not the band's but EMI's. After its failure, executives decided to let Duran Duran choose their own single releases. The band's first selection was "Girls on Film" and it duly became their first Top 5 hit in the UK.

Music video
The video was shot in Soho and directed by Perry Haines, who went on to form i-D Magazine.

There are two different cuts of this video. The second version, which was included in the Duran Duran video album released in 1983, features minor re-edits of certain scenes. The original version of the video was finally released on the Duran Duran (first album) 2010 2CD+DVD remaster.

An example of the differences between the two videos occur during the line, "On the table, signs of love lie scattered." In the original version, Simon is sitting on the couch, ripping up a piece of paper. He then proceeds to take the tulips out of the vase, then throws them in the air. In the second version, it shows a shot of the band on stage, then cuts to Simon taking the tulips and throwing them.

Another example is during the line, "I walked out into the sun, I try to find a new day." In the original, Simon is in the white room, opening the door, with him disappearing into a bright light. In the re-edit, it once again shows a shot of the band on stage, lipsynching.

The band resurrected the song to play live during their reunion shows in 2004 and 2005. The song was accompanied on video screens behind the stage by a unique anime-style video, featuring stylized versions of the band members fighting giant monsters, spaceships, and destroying a skyscraper labelled "EMI" for "Endangered Music Industry" (a dig at the band's old record company).

B-sides, bonus tracks and remixes
The song "Khanada" (pronounced "keh-NAY-duh") was included as the B-side to the single. It is reported to have been written for fashion designer Jane Kahn who owned, with partner Patti Bell, the Hurst Street shop Kahn & Bell where Duran Duran (and numerous other clubgoers of the day) shopped for clothes.

"Careless Memories" is one of three original-era singles that didn't include a remix of the title track (although the fade-out on the 12" is slightly longer), the other two being "Save A Prayer" and "A View to a Kill". To compensate for this, EMI issued a bonus B-side on the 12", a faithful cover of David Bowie's "Fame". However, the "Careless Memories" 12" version fades out at 3:44 seconds, the 7" version three seconds earlier at 3:41. The 7" version is included in the "Singles Box Set 1981-1985" but runs to 3:44 as it includes three seconds of silence after the fade out.

In Japan, the two b-sides were released on the Nite Romantics EP, along with night versions of "Girls on Film" and "Planet Earth".

Formats and track listing

7": EMI. / EMI 5168 United Kingdom
 "Careless Memories" – 3:41
 "Khanada" – 3:17

12": EMI. / 12 EMI 5168 United Kingdom
 "Careless Memories" – 3:53
 "Fame" – 3:11
 "Khanada" – 3:17
 Track 1 is the album version of "Careless Memories".

12": Harvest. / SPRO-9662, SPRO-9663 (Promo) United States 
 "Careless Memories" – 3:53
 "Is There Anyone Out There" – 4.02
 "Girls On Film" – 3.30
 Track 1 is the album version of "Careless Memories".

CD: Part of "Singles Box Set 1981-1985" boxset
 "Careless Memories" – 3:44
 "Khanada" – 3:17
 "Fame" – 3:11
 Track 1 is the 7" version of "Careless Memories".

Chart positions

Other appearances
When the song "Is There Something I Should Know?" was issued as a single in the US, "Careless Memories" was placed on the flipside. The song was also a favourite live staple throughout the 1980s and was included on the live album Arena.

A live version of "Careless Memories" recorded in December 1981 at the Hammersmith Odeon in London was released in 1982 as the b-side to "Hungry Like The Wolf".

"Careless Memories" was one of the few singles not included in either the Decade or Greatest single compilations.

Apart from the single, "Careless Memories" has also appeared on:

Albums:
Duran Duran (1981)
Arena (1984)
Singles Box Set 1981-1985 (2005)

Singles:
 "Hungry Like the Wolf" UK and US (1982)
 "Is There Something I Should Know?" US (1983)

Personnel
Duran Duran are
Simon Le Bon – vocals
Nick Rhodes – keyboards
John Taylor – bass guitar
Roger Taylor – drums
Andy Taylor – guitar

Technical
 Peter Ashworth – sleeve photography

Musical notes
The song has a rock double-timed bass line in the key of E, with a keyboard intro played deliberately off-time.

References

External links
 Duran Duran official web site

1981 singles
Duran Duran songs
Song recordings produced by Colin Thurston
1980 songs
EMI Records singles
Songs written by Simon Le Bon
Songs written by John Taylor (bass guitarist)
Songs written by Roger Taylor (Duran Duran drummer)
Songs written by Andy Taylor (guitarist)
Songs written by Nick Rhodes